This is a list of national parks of Belarus. It also lists main nature reserves.

There are currently four national parks in Belarus. The Belavezhskaya Pushcha National Park is a trans-boundary park between Belarus and Poland.

History

National parks

See also
 Protected areas of Belarus
 List of national parks
 Naliboki forest

References

External links
 Belaviaservice
 Parks and Environmental Reserves in Belarus

Belarus
 
National parks
National parks